Moniak may refer to:

 Moniak, leader of the Golden Horde at the 1470 Battle of Lipnic
 Anhelina Moniak, contestant on season 2 of The Voice of Ukraine (Голос країни)
 Ted Moniak, guitarist for Leisure Class (band)
 Mickey Moniak (born 1998), American baseball player

See also

 Moniaki, Urzędów, Kraśnik, Lublin, Poland
 Moniaki-Kolonia, Urzędów, Kraśnik, Lublin, Poland
 Moniac (disambiguation)
 Moniack (disambiguation)
 Monyak Hill
 Monjack